Martin Donandt was a German fishing trawler that was built in 1927. She was requisitioned by the Kriegsmarine in the Second World War for use as a vorpostenboot. She struck a mine and sank in the Baltic Sea in 1941.

Description
The engine was made by G. Seebeck AG, Wesermünde, Germany. It was rated at 63nhp. The engine powered a single screw propeller.

History
Martin Donandt was built as yard number 466 by G. Seebeck AG, Wesermünde for the Hochseefischerei Bremerhaven. She was launched in August 1927 and completed on 28 September. The fishing boat registration BX 195 was allocated, as were the Code Letters QVLR. On 7 June 1929, her registration was changed to ON 116. In 1934, her Code Letters were changed to DNNR. On 17 October 1934, she was sold to the Nordsee Deutsche Hochseefischerei Bremen-Cuxhaven. Her registration was changed to PG 467.

On 28 September 1939, Martin Donandt was requisitioned by the Kriegsmarine for use as a vorpostenboot. She was allocated to 3 Vorpostenflotille as V 309 Martin Donandt. On 23 September 1941, she sank the Soviet Navy motor torpedo boat  in the Baltic Sea off the Porkkala Lighthouse, Finland. TKA-12 had sunk V 308 Oscar Neynaber with the loss of ten crew. On 28 October 1941, Martin Donandt struck a mine and sank in the Baltic Sea off Liepāja, Latvia with the loss of seven of her crew.

References

Sources

1927 ships
Ships built in Bremen (state)
Fishing vessels of Germany
Steamships of Germany
World War II merchant ships of Germany
Auxiliary ships of the Kriegsmarine
Maritime incidents in October 1941
World War II shipwrecks in the Baltic Sea